This is a list of French football transfers for the 2010 summer transfer window. The summer transfer window opened on 8 June 2010 and closed at midnight on 31 August 2010. Only moves involving Ligue 1 and Ligue 2 clubs are listed. Players without a club may join one at any time, either during or in between transfer windows.

Transfers 

	
 Player who signs with club before 8 June officially joins his new club on 8 June 2010, while player who joined after 8 June joined his new club following his signature of the contract.

References

French
Transfers Summer 2009
Trans
2010